Football is the most popular sport in Ivory Coast. The national team won the Africa Cup of Nations in Senegal in 1992. In 2006 they participated in the 2006 World Cup in Germany. The youth national teams have also done well in world championships, and the clubs from Ivory Coast have won several continental titles. The Ivory Coast national team won a second African cup of nations in 2015.

Famous players from the country include Kolo Touré, Didier Drogba, Wilfried Bony, Yaya Touré, Gervinho, Seydou Doumbia, and Salomon Kalou.

National Competitions 
  
The national championship, organised by the Ivorian Football Federation and sponsored by the company Orange, features 16 clubs in Division 1, 36 in Division 2, 36 in Division 3.
 
Two national cups, the Coupe de Côte d'Ivoire and the Coupe Houphouët-Boigny, put these clubs to grips every year.

International Competitions

National Teams 
In 1984 the Ivory Coast organized the African Cup of Nations with matches in Abidjan and Bouaké. To support the National team and because of the popularity of this sport in the country, the government decided to close the schools for the duration of the competition. Although the national team was eliminated in the first round of the event, no course took place for 2 weeks.

The national team won the African Cup of Nations in 1992 and was a finalist in the competition in 2006. In 2006, for the first time in its history, Ivory Coast qualified for the 2006 FIFA World Cup. In 2008, his Olympic team qualified for the 2008 Summer Olympics.

Clubs 
ASEC Mimosas is based in Abidjan and won the CAF Champions League in the 1998 edition. They also won the 1999 CAF Super Cup over Espérance sportive de Tunis
Stade Abidjan is based in Abidjan and was the first Ivory Coast club to win a continental competition when they won the 1966 African Cup of Champions Clubs. 
Africa Sports d'Abidjan is based in Abidjan and won the 1992 and 1999 editions of the African Cup Winners' Cup.
Stella Club d'Adjamé is based in Abidjan the CAF  Super Cup in 1993.

Ivory Coast clubs have won 6 continental trophies: two in the African Champions League, three Cup victories and a cup success of the African Football Confederation. 
It should be added that Ivory Coast has also won several small subregional tournaments (West Africa) in the club or with its national team. In particular the tournaments of the Council of the Agreement those of ECOWAS or those organised by the UFOA, the Union of the West African Football federations.

Women's football

The women's national team qualified for the 2015 FIFA Women's World Cup.

References